Albert Bates (16 May 1867 – 17 August 1950) was a New Zealand cricketer. He played in eight first-class matches for Canterbury between 1891 and 1898.

See also
 List of Canterbury representative cricketers

References

External links
 

1867 births
1950 deaths
New Zealand cricketers
Canterbury cricketers
Cricketers from Christchurch